Mohamed Mohamed Mohamed Aboutrika (Arabic: محمد محمد محمد أبوتريكة‎ (repeated three times); born 7 November 1978) is an Egyptian retired professional footballer who played as an attacking midfielder and a forward. He came second in the African Footballer of the Year award in 2008 after Emmanuel Adebayor, and was one of five nominees for the 2006 award, and one of the ten nominated for the 2013 award.

Aboutrika won the African Cup of Nations in 2006 with the Egyptian national team. He also scored the winning goal to help Egypt win the 2008 Africa Cup of Nations. He helped his club Al Ahly to win the bronze medal in the FIFA Club World Cup in 2006.

Off the pitch, he has been noted for both various humanitarian efforts as well as controversies. This includes Aboutrika being added to a terror list by his native Egypt for alleged ties to the outlawed Muslim Brotherhood.

Club career

2004: Debut season with Al Ahly
In the first half of Egyptian league 2003–2004, Aboutrika scored 3 goals for Tersana. In January 2004, he was offered a position in Egypt's and Africa's top football team, Al Ahly. He scored 11 goals in his first 13 appearances with Al Ahly in 2003–2004 season (all in the league), coming in the second place between top scorers in the Egyptian League with 14 goals.
 
Aboutrika's efforts with Ahly led to attention from the Egyptian national team, and he started the game against Trinidad and Tobago in a friendly match before the World Cup 2006 qualifiers on 31 March 2004 in Arab Contractors Stadium. The first starting game for Aboutrika ended 2–1 for the Egyptians. He started as an attacker, but was found to play better when he played his normal position behind the attackers in the attacking midfield position. Aboutrika scored his first national goal in this game. He scored 5 goals in his first 6 appearances with Egypt between 2004 and 2005.

2005 season
In 2005, Al Ahly regained the Egyptian League Championship after four years out of the top position, Aboutrika finished 3rd in the goalscoring rankings in the Egyptian League, while also helping his teammate Emad Moteab finish as the competition's top scorer. Also in 2005, Aboutrika played a great role in Al Ahly victory of the 2005 CAF Champions League, he scored an amazing goal in the final with an outrageous effort from 30 yards out against Étoile Sportive du Sahel of Tunisia in a game that ended 3–0 for Al Ahly.

Al Ahly qualified for the 2005 FIFA Club World Championship but finished last, Aboutrika told FIFA.com the reason saying: "Our problem was that we lost our form, for some reason we could not play like we had before arriving in Japan".

2006
He proved to be his international team's trump card en route to victory in the 2006 Africa Cup of Nations in February, when he scored two important goals against Libya and Ivory Coast. He was the winning goal assistant, in the Semi-final match against Senegal when Amr Zaki scored in the 80th minute. He was very dominant in that game, but his accurate shot hit the bar. In the final match, Aboutrika scored the decisive penalty in the shootout which gave Egypt the title.

Aboutrika led Al Ahly to the 2006 CAF Champions League title for the second successive time in November 2006. He was the top scorer of the competition with 8 goals, and scored the winning goal in the final against CS Sfaxien in the 92nd minute.

He participated also with Al Ahly in winning the CAF Super Cup against FAR Rabat of Morocco, days after the Africa Cup of Nations in February.

Locally, he got the Egyptian Premier League in June when he was the top scorer by 18 goals, and won Egypt Cup, then the Egyptian Super Cup in July when he scored the winning goal against ENPPI in the 92nd minute despite having suffered an injury in the first half.

Japanese newspapers nominated Aboutrika to be one of the best players in 2006 FIFA Club World Cup in Japan, the last tournament in Aboutrika's great year. Al-Ahly was one of the African representatives, and the first team ever to be qualified two successive times to this championship, and the first African team to win a medal in that competition.

In the opening match of the tournament against Auckland City FC of New Zealand on 10 Dec 2006, Aboutrika helped Al-Ahly to secure and book a semi-final date with Internacional of Brazil. Al Ahly won 2–0 easily, and Aboutrika capped a fine display by stroking a superbly flighted free-kick over the wall scoring the second goal for his team. As well as netting with his delightful right-foot effort, Aboutrika was at the heart of most his side's best moves, dictating the rhythm with his skill and vision.

In the semi-finals, Al Ahly faced Brazilian Internacional on 13 December 2006, and Aboutrika played a good game, but his accurate shot hit the Brazilian right-hand post to deprive his team from a deserved draw. Al Ahly lost the match 2–1, but proved a good efficiency, yet the ball refused to be netted in many available chances to score in Brazilian goalkeeper.

Al Ahly faced Club América of Mexico, for the third place, and Aboutrika gave Al Ahly the lead with an amazing free-kick over the wall, ending the first half 1–0 for Al Ahly. In the second half, America scored an equalizer, but just as usual, Aboutrika appeared in the 79th minute with a skilled ball, he showed yet again why he is on the shortlist for the African player of the year. After surging out of midfield and finding Flavio Amado with a pinpoint pass, the mercurial playmaker latched on to the Angolan's return ball and calmly slotted the ball past Mexican goalkeeper for his third goal of the tournament. Al Ahly won the third place, after Aboutrika lifted his team to an unprecedented result for the Egyptian club or any African outfit. He finished as the tournament's top scorer with 3 goals in 3 matches.

Aboutrika won all but one of the competitions he participated in that year for club and country, and got the bronze medal for Al Ahly in 2006 FIFA Club World Cup. He was the top scorer in three competitions, which are 2006 FIFA Club World Cup with 3 goals, Egyptian Premier League with 18 goals and 2006 CAF Champions League with 8 goals. Aboutrika scored in other competitions, and made brilliant assistants to strikers.

African Footballer of the Year 2006 Nomination
To the FIFA.com expression, was nominated to win the 2006 CAF African Footballer of the Year award along with Chelsea striker Didier Drogba and FC Barcelona forward Samuel Eto'o. The other nominees for the honour were Ghana international midfielder Michael Essien, who played for Italian Giants AC Milan, and Nigeria's Nwankwo Kanu, who has twice grabbed the award. Aboutrika said in November 2006: "I would love to be nominated for the CAF Best Player award. That would make 2006 a very special year!".

Aboutrika was the only African based player between nominees, but he is also the only one who made an achievement for his national team that year by winning African Cup of Nations 2006. Aboutrika's brace in 2006 FIFA Club World Cup and his dazzling performances throughout the season made him a serious contender for the CAF African Footballer of the Year award (as well as the BBC one) and secured his standing as Egypt's most popular personality. He did not win the prize but got second place and later was given "best inter-club player" and "best player in the CAF Champions League."

"Aboutrika has won the highest prize any person can achieve, that is the love of the people," sports columnist Hassan Mistikawi wrote in the top-selling state-owned Al-Ahram daily.

Al Ahly Portuguese coach Manuel José de Jesus describes Aboutrika as "the best football player in Africa". He said that Aboutrika has more and more skills that did not appear in Japan. He said: "Aboutrika didn't introduce all what he has in FIFA Club World Cup 2006, but he got the top scorer title and helped leading his team to the third place". José sees Aboutrika as one of the best players he ever trained. He assured this meaning saying: "Aboutrika is priceless for us. I can't imagine my team without him".

2007
In 2007, Al Ahly won the Egyptian Premier League (2006–2007) for the third successive season. Aboutrika scored 7 goals for his team, although he was injured. Al-Ahly won the Egypt Cup 2007 for the second successive time. Aboutrika was the top goalscorer of the competition with 4 goals. He scored a double kick memorable goal against Tala'ea El-Gaish SC in the 8-round game which ended 3–1 for Al-Ahly. In the final, Al-Ahly faced his rival Zamalek SC. Aboutrika made a one neck-saving equalizer in the last 2 minutes on 2 July 2007 in the Egypt Cup resulting in extra-time after tying 2–2. After El-Zamalek grabbed their third in the first half of extra-time, Aboutrika dazzled the stands with two great balls, one an assisted cross over the whites' defense to Osama Hosny to score the equalizer in second half of extra-time in the first seconds of the game and within a minute, he surged between the Zamalek's midfield and passed two Zamalek players before providing an accurate through pass to Ahmad Sedik on the wing who went through on goal and assisted again for Osama Hosny for the late winner and holding high the Egyptian Cup. After that, Al-Ahly won the Egyptian Super Cup 2007 for the third successive time, through shootouts, after tying 1–1 with Ismaily.

In 2007 CAF Champions League, Aboutrika scored 4 goals for Al-Ahly until now, to raise his African goals to the number 15. Al-Ahly faced Étoile Sportive du Sahel of Tunisia in the final match. Al-Ahly was having the chance to be the first team in the World to reach FIFA Club World Cup three successive times, and the first team in Africa to win CAF Champions League three successive times. However, the two legs ended seeing Étoile Sportive du Sahel of Tunisia lifting the cup.

He won the title Best Player in Egypt for 2007 the fourth successive time after 2004, 2005, 2006 and 2007 setting a new Egyptian record.

2008 
African Cup of Nations 2008
In 2008, Aboutrika scored 4 goals for Egypt in the 2008 Africa Cup of Nations. He scored the winning goal against Cameroon in the final match, helping Egypt to win the African Cup of Nations for the second consecutive tournament. Aboutrika also scored a goal in the semi-final against Ivory Coast, and scored twice against Sudan in Egypt's group stage match.

Aboutrika scored a goal in the final match. In the previous tournament in 2006, he scored the latest decisive penalty shootout in the final match against Ivory Coast to give Egypt the cup. With his team Al-Ahly of Egypt, Aboutrika was the hero of final matches again, through scoring a goal in the final match second leg both 2006 and 2005 CAF Champions League helping his team lift the continental cup.

CAF Champions League 2008
Aboutrika rehealed from injury in August, after missing the group stage start of 2008 CAF Champions League with his team Al-Ahly. He marked his first participation in the group stage scoring the winning goal for Al-Ahly in the 93rd minute against Dynamos F.C. of Zimbabwe in an 8-round game that ended 2–1 for the Egyptian side. On 30 August, he helped Al-Ahly to grab the 3 points from Zimbabwe, after making the winning goal, scored by his favourite teammate Mohamed Barakat. Al-Ahly achieved a 1–0 win. On 14 September, Aboutrika scored the second goal for Al-Ahly against the rivals Zamalek SC of Egypt, in a group game that ended 2–2.

Aboutrika scored again in the final group match against ASEC Mimosas, a game ended 2–2 as Aboutrika netted the first goal for Al-Ahly. A draw sealed first place in Group A for Al-Ahly with 12 points from six matches while Dynamos of Zimbabwe joined them in the semi-finals of the 3.5-million-dollar competition.

Aboutrika was crowned the 2008 BBC African Footballer of the Year. He won after taking more than half of the total ballot.

African Footballer of the Year 2008 Nomination 
Mohamed Aboutrika (Al-Ahly, Egypt), Emmanuel Adebayor (Arsenal, Togo), Amr Zaki (Wigan Athletic, Egypt), Didier Drogba (Chelsea F.C., Ivory Coast) and Michael Essien (Chelsea F.C., Ghana) make up the shortlist for the Glo-CAF African Footballer of the Year across the world.

The Confederation of African Football (CAF) on Wednesday in Lagos, Nigeria, announced the final shortlist of categories for the Glo-CAF Awards 2008. The final three for the title was decided following votes from the head coaches of the 53 national associations affiliated to CAF.

For the topmost honour, Glo-CAF Player of the Year across the world, the contenders are Emmanuel Adebayor (Arsenal and Togo), Michael Essien (Chelsea and Ghana) and Mohamed Aboutrika (Al-Ahly and Egypt).

The shortlist for the Glo-CAF Best Player on the Continent are Mohamed Aboutrika (Al-Ahly, Egypt), Ahmed Hassan (Al-Ahly, Egypt), Flavio Amado (Al-Ahly, Angola).

The winner of the two categories will be announced at the awards gala on 10 February, in Lagos, Nigeria.

FIFA World Cup 2010 Qualifiers

On 7 June, Aboutrika scored in Egypt's world cup qualifier against Algeria in Algeria but Egypt lost 3–1.

On 4 July, Aboutrika played in Egypt's world cup qualifier against Rwanda in Egypt, helping the Egyptians win 3–0, and scored the first and the third goal, making the Egyptian team second after Algeria, in their group. Aboutrika reached his fifth goal in FIFA World Cup 2010 Qualifiers.

2012 
Port Said Stadium disaster
After the Port Said Stadium disaster, on 1 February 2012, Aboutrika decided to retire from professional football, along with Emad Motaeb and Mohamed Barakat, then he decided to get back to football. Around a week later, the Egyptian Premier League had been cancelled. Aboutrika had finished the uncompleted campaign with 4 goals in 14 games.

CAF Champions League
Aboutrika helped Al-Ahly won their seventh CAF Champions League title after scoring 6 goals. His most impressive match was on 14 May 2012. Ahly were down 1–0 at home to Stade Malien in a second leg CAF Champions League match and were down 2–0 on aggregate. Aboutrika was subbed on in the 42nd minute for Mohamed Shawky and in the second half, he scored his first ever CAF Champions League hat-trick, 2 of which were scored in the last 8 minutes of the match. He scored the first from a wonderfully curled free-kick from 28 yards out. He then scored the second from the penalty spot in the 82nd minute. Finally, he blasted the third from into the top right corner from 12 yards out to get the hat-trick, complete the comeback, and secure Al-Ahly a place in the 2012 CAF Champions League group stage. On 22 July 2012, he scored against Al-Zamalek to win 1–0 in the group stage match.

London 2012
Aboutrika was one of the three overage players participated with Egypt in London 2012, and was the team's captain. Aboutrika scored Egypt's first goal in the tournament against Brazil in a 3–2 loss. In the second game, Aboutrika's assist for Mohamed Salah picked a 1–1 draw against New Zealand. In the third game against Belarus, Aboutrika assisted a goal for Mohamed Salah and scored another to help Egypt win 3–1 and claim a quarter-final berth.

Club World Cup
Aboutrika scored the winner goal for Al Ahly in a 2–1 victory over Japanese side Sanfrecce Hiroshima. A goal secured his team a place in the Quarter-finals. Al-Ahly came fourth in the tournament. Aboutrika became the joint all-time top scorer in the FIFA Club World Cup with 4 goals along with Lionel Messi and Denilson.

Africa Based Player of the Year
Aboutrika was crowned African player of the Year Based in Africa. The 34-year-old secured his third title after winning the same award in 2008 and 2006.

2013 
In the first half of the year, Aboutrika agreed to join Baniyas SC for loan. He helped the Emirati team to win Gulf Champions League, scoring in the semi final and final matches. He scored also in his debut match with the team.

Aboutrika returned to Al-Ahly to help Al Ahly retain his continental title. In his first match after return, he scored against Zamalek SC in the 2013 CAF Champions League group stage. The game ended 1–1 and this was Aboutrika's 12th goal in Cairo Derby, a personal record. On 15 September, Aboutrika scored his 13th goal in Cairo Derby. With this goal, he became the top goalscorer in all Cairo Derby matches alongside Al Ahly Legend Mahmoud Mokhtar El-Tetsh. Al Ahly won 4–2 tooadvance to the Semi-finals of 2013 CAF Champions League. In the semi-final first leg held on 6 October at Cameroon, Aboutrika grabbed the equaliser against Coton Sport FC de Garoua in the first leg, which ended 1–1. In the final match first leg in Orlando Stadium Aboutrika scored Al-Ahly's goal in a 1–1 draw against Orlando Pirates of South Africa on 2 November. In the second leg held in Cairo on 10 November, Aboutrika opened the scoring for Al-Ahly as they went on to win 2–0, retaining the title. That was Aboutrika's 32nd goal for Al-Ahly in African Competitions. He is the second all-time top scorer after Al-Ahly legend Mahmoud El Khatib who scored 37 goals. Aboutrika provided 21 assists in continental matches too in addition to his 32 goals.

Individually, Aboutrika was named in July by Goal.com in the Goal 50 list for (2012/2013) season. He took the 29th spot. He is the first Africa-based player to appear in the Goal 50 for a second time after being named in 45th spot in 2009.

On the international level, On 26 March, Aboutrika grabbed a last minute goal for Egypt national football team against Zimbabwe national football team in a World Cup Qualifier helping hosts to win 2–1. On 9 June, he started the score sheet in Harare and Egypt won 4–2, and made two assists for his teammate Mohamed Salah. On 10 September, Aboutrika played his 100th historic cap with Egypt national football team against Guinea national football team in a World Cup Qualifier. He scored a goal and assisted two goals for Mohamed Salah and Amr Zaki. Egypt won 4–2 and set to advance to a two-leg play-off during October and November against Ghana, with the winners qualifying for Brazil 2014. Aboutrika is the second joint top scorer of the CAF second round qualifiers with 5 goals in 6 qualifiers, and 9 assists. After scoring in the play-off against Ghana, he became the all-time top scorer of Egypt in the World Cup Qualifiers with 14 goals.

African Footballer of the Year 2013 Nomination
On 5 December 2013, the Confederation of African Football's (CAF) announced its reduced shortlist of ten nominees for the 2013 Player of the Year award. Aboutrika was one of the final ten nominees. The head coaches of the national football associations affiliated to CAF voted to decide the eventual winner of the award. The winner, Yaya Touré, was announced at the Glo-CAF Awards Gala on 9 January in Lagos, Nigeria.

Retirement
He announced his retirement via Twitter on 20 December 2013, after Egypt failed to qualify to the 2014 FIFA World Cup in Brazil.

International career

Summary
As of 19 November 2013, Aboutrika scored 38 goals in 100 matches for Egypt. He debuted against Estonia on 19 March 2001, but had to wait for 3 years to receive another call-up. His second call-up witnessed his first international goal against Trinidad and Tobago on 31 March 2004. He became an essential player since then, and scored 5 goals in his first 6 appearances with Egypt in 2004 and 2005. Aboutrika helped Egypt win two consecutive African Cup of Nations in 2006 and 2008 scoring the decisive penalty kick in 2006 final match, and the only winning goal in 2008 final. Also, he is the all-time top scorer of Egypt in the World Cup Qualifiers with 14 goals.

2006 FIFA World Cup Qualification
Aboutrika was an essential member of the Egyptian team at the 2006 FIFA World Cup qualifier. He scored 3 goals in the first 3 matches of the qualifiers. The first goal was against Sudan on 6 June 2004 in a 3–0 victory in Khartoum Stadium. The second goal came on 20 June 2004, in Alexandria Stadium in a loss 2–1 against Ivory Coast. The third goal was in Benin on 4 July 2004 helped Egypt to get a tie 3–3 from hosts in Stade de l'Amitié.

2006 African Cup of Nations
Aboutrika proved to be his international team's trump card en route to victory in the 2006 Africa Cup of Nations in February, when he scored two important goals against Libya and Ivory Coast. He was the winning goal assistant, in the Semi-final match against Senegal when Amr Zaki scored in the 80th minute. He was very dominant in that game, but his accurate shot hit the bar. In the final match, Aboutrika scored the decisive penalty in the shootout which gave Egypt the title.

2008 African Cup of Nations
Aboutrika was part of the Egyptian team which defended their title in 2008 Africa Cup of Nations in Ghana. Aboutrika scored 4 goals for Egypt. The most important goal was the winning goal against Cameroon in the final match, helping Egypt to win the African Cup of Nations for the second consecutive tournament. Aboutrika also scored a goal in the semi-final against Ivory Coast, and scored twice against Sudan in Egypt's group stage match.

2009 FIFA Confederations Cup
Aboutrika was a member in Egypt football national team line-up in 2009 FIFA Confederations Cup. Egypt were drawn in Group B along with Brazil, Italy and USA.

Egypt started with Brazil on 15 June, a game ended 4–3 for the Brazilian side. Aboutrika assisted Egypt's two goals, to his teammate Mohamed Zidan who scored twice.

The Italian sports journalist Gabriele Marcotti has also been highly impressed with Aboutrika's performance against Brazil, and praised Aboutrika's career with football in general. {{quote|He is possibly the greatest footballer in the history of the world with a bachelor's diploma in philosophy hanging on the wall of his sitting room. He is arguably the best footballer on Earth not playing his trade in Europe or South America. and Does staying in Egypt make him gutless and unambitious because he won't measure himself against the world's best on a regular basis? Or, in fact, should he be admired for remaining loyal to his homeland, simply being happy with what he has achieved and not feeling the need to chase the glamour and millions of the Premier League or La Liga?. }}

Egypt faced Italy on 18 June, a game ended with a victory 1–0 for Egypt. Aboutrika assisted Egypt's goal, to his teammate Mohamed Soliman "Homos" who scored with a header.

2010 FIFA World Cup Qualification
After the friendly match against Argentina, Aboutrika had an injury which deprived him from being a member along the national team in the first 4 matches played in June, in FIFA World Cup 2010 Qualifiers. He marked his national return against Congo DR in Kinshasa on 7 September 2008 scoring the winning goal for Egypt, to secure the Pharaohs' place in the second round of Qualifications. He scored another goal in his second match in the qualifiers against Djibouti.

On 7 June 2009, Aboutrika scored in Egypt's world cup qualifier against Algeria in Algeria but Egypt lost 3–1. On 4 July 2009, Aboutrika played in Egypt's world cup qualifier against Rwanda in Egypt, helping the Egyptians win 3–0, and scored the first and the third goal, making the Egyptian team second after Algeria, in their group. Aboutrika reached his fifth goal in FIFA World Cup 2010 Qualifiers.

2012 Summer Olympics
Aboutrika was one of the three overage players participated with Egypt in London 2012, and was the team's captain. Aboutrika scored Egypt's first goal in the tournament against Brazil in a loss 3–2. In the second game, Aboutrika's assist for Mohamed Salah picked a 1–1 draw against New Zealand. In the third game against Belarus, Aboutrika assisted a goal for Mohamed Salah and scored another to help Egypt win 3–1 and claim a quarter-final berth.

2014 FIFA World Cup Qualification

In the 2014 FIFA World Cup qualifiers, Aboutrika was the second joint top scorer of the Second Round Qualifiers with 5 goals and 9 assists in 6 qualifiers. The first two goals came on Stade du 28 Septembre, helping Egypt to get a win 3–2 over Guinea. On 26 March 2013, Aboutrika grabbed his third goal, a last minute penalty kick for Egypt against Zimbabwe helping hosts to win 2–1. On 9 June, he started the score sheet in Harare and Egypt won 4–2, and made two assists for his teammate Mohamed Salah. On 10 September 2013, Aboutrika played his 100th historic cap with Egypt national football team against Guinea in a World Cup Qualifier. He scored a goal and assisted two goals for Mohamed Salah and Amr Zaki. Egypt won 4–2.

Egypt set to advance to a two-leg play-off during October and November against Ghana, with the winners qualifying for Brazil 2014. Aboutrika scored Egypt's only goal in Kumasi but Egypt got a shocking loss 6–1. Yet, Aboutrika became the joint top scorer of the 2014 FIFA World Cup qualification (CAF) with 6 goals. In addition to 3 goals in 2006 qualifiers, and 5 goals in 2010 qualifiers, Aboutrika became the all-time top scorer of Egypt in the World Cup Qualifiers with 14 goals.

 Personal life 
Aboutrika is a graduate of Cairo University with a Bachelor of Arts degree in philosophy. He is married and has three children. Ahmed is a professional footballer.

Bob Bradley, the American coach of Egypt national football team said in March 2013 about Aboutrika: "Everywhere we went people would say, 'You must pick Aboutrika'. He's incredibly popular and the people love him. He's respected not just as a player but as a man. He did all of the right things to keep himself at a high level. He is without a doubt a leader for us, and he brings experience and intelligence in a way that can make a very big difference".

Humanitarian role
As his soccer star status grew in Africa, he turned his sights to humanitarian issues. Aboutrika said:
"Every athlete has a humanitarian role in society. He doesn't live solely for himself, but for others, too. I like to participate in charity work and try my best to help the poor and penniless. I'm also seeking to use soccer in humanitarian work."

With that ideal, Aboutrika joined UNDP Goodwill Ambassadors the Brazilian player Ronaldo, and French player, Zinedine Zidane, in addition to 40 international soccer stars in 2005 for a 'Match Against Poverty' in Germany, with the aim of raising funds and increasing awareness about the issue worldwide. He scored in that match.

"In that humanitarian match, sports people said 'no to poverty' in one strong voice, standing up to beat it once and for all," Aboutrika explains. The match was held in Düsseldorf, Germany with the support of the Fédération Internationale de Football Association FIFA.

One of Aboutrika's soccer role models, is the Egyptian player, Mahmoud El Khatib. Meanwhile, off the pitch he follows the example of the Prophet Mohammed.

He volunteered to appear in a WFP 30-second Public Service Announcement (PSA) in which he draws attention to the tragic fact that 25,000 people die from hunger every day, 18,000 of them children.

"Hunger takes away a child every five seconds. We have to move immediately and lend each other a hand because every second counts. This is a game we have to win," Aboutrika said in the PSA. The PSA is being aired on Middle Eastern TV stations which are broadcasting it for free.

He believes that poverty is a double-edged sword, as it can either give rise to feelings of despair, or help the poor person to persevere and be determined. Aboutrika wishes that all those who suffer from despair could develop determination and face their difficulties with strength.

"Islam deals with the problem of poverty through zakat (spending a fixed portion of one's wealth for the poor or needy), where the rich feel the plight of the poor," says Aboutrika. "We have to help the poor as much as we can so that they don’t feel alienated in their own society" he says.

In October 2013, Aboutrika commissioned his own-sponsored mosque in Ghana when the Egyptian team arrived for the crucial 2014 World Cup playoff. The Al-Ahly ace is reported to have used his funds to build a much-needed mosque to serve the people of Tafo in the Ashanti Region.

Sympathy with Gaza
After scoring a goal in Egypt's 3–0 over Sudan in the 2008 African Cup of Nations
Aboutrika removed his jersey to show a T-shirt reading "Sympathize with Gaza". He was protesting against Israel's 10-day blockade of Gaza. He was given a yellow card for breaking FIFA's rule against displaying political slogans during play, and was said to face possible further sanctions, but finally CAF made no punishments.

Aboutrika initially did not want to discuss the issue, but he broke his silence and spoke exclusively to Al Jazeera's Carrie Brown. He said that his action was a personal statement from himself, as he feels much sympathy for the children of Gaza Strip who are under siege. He feels sorry for their starving and suffering, and has many worries about their safety. Aboutrika affirmed for the Egyptian Football Federation that he is responsible for any problems appearing on surface. In the months and years since the Carrie Brown/Aboutrika interview, much has been made as to the true meanings of Aboutrika's statement.

Some Arab commentators describes this yellow card as an 'honourable punishment' for any athlete. In Gaza, Palestinian people went out, raising Aboutrika's photos thanking him and appreciating his act. The same scene was replied after the final match, when Aboutrika scored the winning goal for Egypt, many Palestinians went out to celebrate the victory and singing for Aboutrika. Al-Hilal club in the Gaza Strip made an honouring ceremony for Aboutrika where youth team players lift flags reading "Palestine loves Aboutrika ", "Aboutrika is my idol", "Aboutrika, the humanitarian player..Gaza won't forget you" and "Aboutrika, an example of freedom and dignity". Youth team players were wearing Aboutrika 's No22.

Supporting Ultras Ahlawy
Breaking with the tradition of soccer players standing on the sidelines of popular revolts in the Middle East and North Africa, if not supporting autocratic leaders, Aboutrika announced late that he would not be joining his fellow Al Ahly players on 9 September 2012 in Egypt Super Cup final against ENPPI, Egypt's first domestic match since this month's lifting of a seven-month ban on professional soccer.

In doing so Aboutrika one of Egypt's most popular players, sided with Ultras Ahlawy, the club's militant, highly politicized, well organized, street-battle hardened support group. The group opposes the resumption of soccer as long as justice has not been done for the 74 Ahly supporters who were killed in February Egypt's worst sporting incident in a politically loaded brawl in the Suez Canal city of Port Said and fans are not allowed to attend matches.

The brawl, which widely is believed to have been provoked by security forces in a bid to punish the ultras for their key role in the ousting of president Hosni Mubarak and violent opposition to the military that ruled Egypt until the election in July of president Mohammed Morsi in the country's first democratic poll, sparked the banning of soccer for most of this year.

 Subsequent controversy 
Aboutrika's assets were frozen in the spring of 2015 because of his shares in the Asshab Tours Company, whose manager was allegedly a Muslim Brother. Aboutrika denied any involvement in the Muslim Brotherhood saying the company's co-owner who was so accused had left the previous year. Aboutrika's two appeals were rejected, but then the administrative court overturned the verdict in June 2016. (Discourses of Public Behavior in Egypt / Sherifa Zuhur / Paper prepared for the Association of Middle Eastern and African Studies, September 2016.

On 17 January 2017, Egypt has added him to a terror list for alleged ties to the outlawed Muslim Brotherhood, his lawyer told Reuters.

Homophobia Controversy
On November 29, 2021, Aboutrika, in response to a question about the UK Premier League's Rainbow Laces Campaign, on Qatari channel beIN Sports, made a number of statements critical of the campaign and of gay rights.

He was quoted saying:

"Our role is to stand up to this phenomenon, homosexuality, because it's a dangerous ideology and it's becoming nasty and people are not ashamed of it anymore.”

"Allah says in the Quran that we have to honor the children of Adam but by doing this homosexuality we are not honoring humans, we are humiliating them.”

"They (the Premier League) will tell you that homosexuality is human rights. No, it is not human rights; in fact, it's against humanity."

His comments were criticized by the Premier League as well as Fare, an anti-discrimination organization in football.

Career statistics
Club

1Includes appearances in the Egypt Cup
2Includes appearances in the CAF Champions League
3Includes appearances in the Championship Playoff,GCC Champions League,Egyptian Super Cup, CAF Super Cup and FIFA Club World Cup

International

International goalsScores and results list Egypt's goal tally first.''

Egypt U23

Honours and achievements
Al Ahly
 Egyptian Premier League: 2004–05, 2005–06, 2006–07, 2007–08, 2008–09, 2009–10, 2010–11
 Egypt Cup: 2006, 2007
 Egyptian Super Cup: 2005, 2006, 2007, 2008, 2010
 CAF Champions League: 2005, 2006, 2008, 2012, 2013
 CAF Super Cup: 2006, 2007, 2009, 2013

Baniyas SC
 GCC Champions League: 2012–13

Egypt
 African Cup of Nations: 2006, 2008
 Nile Basin Tournament: 2011

Awards 
 EFA Egyptian Player of the Year: 2005, 2006, 2007, 2008
 African Inter-Club Player of the Year: 2006, 2008, 2012, 2013
 CAF Team of the Year: 2006, 2008, 2012, 2013
 Africa Cup of Nations Dream Team: 2006, 2008
 World's Most Popular Footballer: 2007, 2008
 El Heddaf Arab Footballer of the Year: 2007, 2008, 2012
 Al Mountakhab Arab Footballer of the Year: 2008
 BBC African Footballer of the Year: 2008
 2008 Africa Cup of Nations Final: Man of the Match
 FIFA Confederations Cup Dream Team: 2009
 Goal 50: 2009, 2013
 IFFHS Legends: 2016

Orders 
 Order of the Republic (Egypt)

Performances 
 Egyptian Second Division top goalscorer: 1999–00
 Egyptian Premier League top goalscorer: 2005–06
 FIFA Club World Cup top goalscorer: 2006
 Egypt Cup top goalscorer: 2007
 FIFA Confederations Cup top assist provider: 2009 (Shared with Elano, Maicon and Joan Capdevila)
 FIFA World Cup qualification top goalscorer: 2014 (Shared with Mohamed Salah and Asamoah Gyan)
Records
  African Inter-Club Player of the Year (Based in Africa): 2006, 2008, 2012–13

See also

 List of men's footballers with 100 or more international caps

References

External links 

Mohamed Aboutrika at RSSSF

1978 births
Living people
Sportspeople from Giza
Egyptian footballers
Egyptian Muslims
Egypt international footballers
2006 Africa Cup of Nations players
2008 Africa Cup of Nations players
Association football midfielders
Tersana SC players
Al Ahly SC players
Baniyas Club players
2009 FIFA Confederations Cup players
Olympic footballers of Egypt
Footballers at the 2012 Summer Olympics
FIFA Century Club
UAE Pro League players
Egyptian Premier League players
Egyptian expatriate sportspeople in the United Arab Emirates
Egyptian expatriate footballers
Expatriate footballers in the United Arab Emirates